Pilar Castro (born 12 October 1970) is a Spanish film, television and stage actress.

Biography 
Pilar Castro was born in Madrid on 12 October 1970. Before turning actress, she worked as a dancer. Then she trained her acting jobs at Cristina Rota's school. She has since had a film, television and stage career. She landed her debut TV performance with a guest appearance in Este es mi barrio.

She hosted the 8th Feroz Awards in 2021.

Filmography

Feature film

Short films

Television

Accolades 

|-
| align = "center" | 2008 || 11th Málaga Film Festival || Best Short Film Actress || Test ||  || 
|-
| align = "center" rowspan = "2" | 2010 || 24th Goya Awards || Best Supporting Actress || rowspan = "2" | Fat People ||  || 
|-
| 19th Actors and Actresses Union Awards || Best Film Actress in a Minor Role ||  || align = "center" | 
|-
| align = "center" | 2011 || 14th Málaga Film Festival || Best Short Film Actress ('Biznaga de Plata') || El premio ||  || 
|-
| align = "center" | 2018 || 27th Actors and Actresses Union Awards || Best Film Actress in a Minor Role || It's for Your Own Good ||  || 
|-
| align = "center" | 2020 || 7th Feroz Awards || Best Actress (film) || Advantages of Travelling by Train ||  || align = "center" | 
|}

References

External links
 

1970 births
Living people
Actresses from Madrid
21st-century Spanish actresses
Spanish film actresses
Spanish television actresses
Spanish stage actresses